The 2015 ISCM World Music Days of the International Society for Contemporary Music were held from 26 September to 2 October 2015 in Slovenia, which had previously hosted the 2003 ISCM World Music Days. Artistic director was again Slovene composer Pavel Mihelčič, who also directs the annual Unicum Contemporary Music Festival. Organized in cooperation with the Society of Slovene Composers, the festival brought together a selection of recently composed music from six continents. In the main programme, about 40 Slovenian compositions with a focus on young Slovenian composers were presented along with 50 foreign compositions.

Musical ensembles included the RTV Slovenia Symphony Orchestra, the Slovene Philharmonic String Chamber Orchestra, the Slovene Chamber Choir, and the Slovene Philharmonic Orchestra.

The 2015 World Music Days were criticized for its limited audience, further diminished by the unusually tight budget for the accommodation of international ISCM representatives.

References

External links
 

2015
2015 music festivals
2015 in Slovenia
Classical music festivals in Slovenia
Cultural events in Ljubljana
2015 festivals in Europe